Glenn Patterson Turner (May 4, 1889 – July 10, 1975) was a lawyer from Milwaukee who served one term as a Socialist Party of America member of the Wisconsin State Assembly.

Background 
Turner was born on May 4, 1889, in Stockbridge, Wisconsin. He attended the public schools of the various places where his father served as a Methodist minister. He became interested in socialism as a boy, through the influence of his
Sunday school teacher, a German iron moulder, who started him reading Socialist literature. He joined the Socialist Party as soon as he was permitted to join (the age of 18). He graduated in 1909 from North Division High School (Milwaukee), and attended the University of Wisconsin. He graduated from the University of Wisconsin Law School, and was admitted to the Wisconsin bar in 1916. He then returned to Milwaukee to practice. Later in life he was a strong proponent of Esperanto. He died on July 10, 1975 at a nursing home in Black Earth, Wisconsin.

Legislature 
Turner was elected to the Assembly in 1916 to succeed fellow Socialist Frank J. Weber, receiving 3,054 votes against 2,067 for S. A. Heiden (Republican) and 1038 for A. E. Wanda (Democrat). He was assigned to the standing committee on the judiciary.

He did not run for re-election in 1918, but was succeeded by fellow Socialist and lawyer Edwin Knappe, who like Turner was a member of the law firm of Kleist, Harriman &
Knappe.

Attorney General 
In 1930, Turner was the Socialist candidate for state Attorney General; he came in third in a five-way race, with 6.4% of the vote (35,169 out of 551,563).

References 

People from Stockbridge, Wisconsin
Politicians from Milwaukee
University of Wisconsin–Madison alumni
University of Wisconsin Law School alumni
Members of the Wisconsin State Assembly
Socialist Party of America politicians from Wisconsin
Wisconsin lawyers
1889 births
1975 deaths
20th-century American politicians
North Division High School (Milwaukee) alumni
20th-century American lawyers